Admiral Cook may refer to:

Francis A. Cook (1843–1916), U.S. Navy rear admiral
James Dunbar Cook (1921–2007), British Royal Navy rear admiral

See also
Eric Longley-Cook (1898–1983), British Royal Navy vice admiral
Admiral Cooke (disambiguation)